Jens Langeneke (born 29 March 1977) is a German former professional footballer who played as a defender.

References

External links
 

1977 births
Living people
German footballers
Association football defenders
SV Lippstadt 08 players
Rot-Weiß Oberhausen players
VfL Osnabrück players
Rot Weiss Ahlen players
Fortuna Düsseldorf players
Bundesliga players
2. Bundesliga players
3. Liga players
People from Lippstadt
Sportspeople from Arnsberg (region)
Footballers from North Rhine-Westphalia